Dorymyrmex bureni also known as pyramid ant is a species of ant in the genus Dorymyrmex. Described by Trager in 1988, the species is endemic to the United States and Mexico. Pyramid ants are medium-sized ants, ranging from 2–4 mm. They are light orange in color and fast moving. Unlike other ants in the area like red imported fire ants (Solenopsis invicta), this species is not aggressive towards humans. The workers have a foul smelling coconut odor when crushed. Dorymyrmex bureni hunt living insects, even other winged ants. They also search for sap-sucking insects from which they collect honeydew. On the head of these ants are curved hairs, used for transporting beads of damp sand. Colonies are small. Nests usually have a single entrance with a mound of sand shaped like a crater. Dorymyrmex bureni prefer sandy soil. This species of ant is not an indoor pest, and pesticides should not be used. They are found throughout Florida.

References

External links

Dorymyrmex
Hymenoptera of North America
Insects described in 1988